Warisaliganj Assembly constituency is one of 243 constituencies of legislative assembly of Bihar. It is part of  Nawada Lok Sabha constituency.

Overview
Warisaliganj comprises CD Blocks Warisaliganj, Kashichak and Pakribarawan.

Members of Legislative Assembly

Election Results

2020

References

External links
 

Politics of Nawada district
Assembly constituencies of Bihar